The Rwandan franc (sign: FRw, and possibly RF or R₣; ISO 4217: RWF) is the currency of Rwanda. It is subdivided into 100 centimes.

History
The franc became the currency of Rwanda in 1916, when Belgium occupied the previously German colony and the Belgian Congo franc replaced the German East African rupie. Rwanda used the currency of the Belgian Congo until 1960, when the Rwanda and Burundi franc was introduced. Rwanda began issuing its own francs in 1964, two years after gaining independence.

A proposal exists to introduce a common currency, a new East African shilling, for the five member states of the East African Community. Whilst originally scheduled to occur by the end of 2012, as of March 2023, a common currency has still yet to be introduced.

Coins
In 1964, coins were introduced for 1, 5 and 10 francs, with the 1 and 10 francs in cupronickel and the 5 francs in bronze. A reduced sized copper-nickel 10 franc coin was issued in 1974.

Brass 20 and 50 francs were introduced in 1977. New series of 1 to 50 franc coins were issued in 2004 (dated 2003) and a new bimetallic coin of 100 francs was introduced in 2008 (dated 2007) 
1 franc - 98% Aluminium,  2% Magnesium
5 francs - Bronze
10 francs - Bronze
20 francs - Nickel-plated steel
50 francs - Nickel-plated steel
100 francs - Nickel-plated steel ring and Copper-plated steel centre

Banknotes
In 1964, provisional notes were created for use in Rwanda by handstamping (20 to 100 francs) or embossing (500 and 1,000 francs) Rwanda-Burundi notes bearing their original dates and signatures. These were followed by regular issues for the same amounts dated 1964 to 1976.

20 and 50 franc notes were replaced by coins in 1977, with 5,000 franc notes introduced in 1978. The nation's first-ever 2,000 franc note was introduced in mid-December 2007.  In 2008 the bank replaced the 100 franc note with a bimetallic coin, and revoked the notes’ legal tender status on 31 December 2009. On September 24, 2013, the National Bank of Rwanda issued a redesigned 500 franc note depicting cows on the front and students with XO computers (from One Laptop per Child) on the back. In December 2014, the National Bank of Rwanda issued 2,000 and 5,000 franc notes with revised security features and the removal of French descriptions on the notes. In October 2015, the National Bank of Rwanda issued a revised 1000 franc note with improved security features and the removal of French descriptions on the notes.

On 7 February 2019, the National Bank of Rwanda announced new 500 francs and 1,000 francs banknotes would be introduced on 11 February 2019. These banknotes will have new security features and better quality to reduce wear. The design of the front of the 500 franc note is entirely new, and the overall color has been changed to brown to help distinguish it from the 1,000 franc note.

Historical exchange rates
Rwandan francs per US dollar:
262.20 (1995)
393.44 (2000)
610 (2005)
570 (2010)
689 (2014)
760 (2016)
947 (2020)

See also

 Economy of Rwanda
 Burundian franc

References

External links
 

Circulating currencies
Franc
Currencies introduced in 1964
Currencies of the Commonwealth of Nations